Abimbola Rosemary "Bimbo" Odukoya  (12 September 1960 – 11 December 2005), was a Nigerian pastor and televangelist who was married to the founder of the Fountain of Life Church, Taiwo Odukoya.

Odukoya, often called "Pastor Bims," was a receiver of over 60 national and international awards for her contributions to nation building, the development of her country, Nigeria, and the West Africa sub region, and for leadership as a woman of high moral standards and a role model to many. A writer, popular televangelist, highly sought conference speaker, youth mentor and marriage counsellor, she was one of several individuals chosen by Samsung to represent Nigeria in carrying the Olympic Torch in Athens, Greece at the 2004 Olympic Games. She died as a result of the Sosoliso Airlines Flight 1145 crash.

Life
Pastor Bimbo married the founding pastor of the Fountain of Life Church, Pastor Taiwo Odukoya, and they had three children Tolu Odukoya, (Pastor) Jimmy Odukoya and Tobi Odukoya.

At the time of her death, she was the associate senior pastor of The Fountain of Life Church and the President of Discovery for Women.

She was the host of Single and Married, a television program broadcast locally and internationally that deals with practical issues people face in marriages and relationships. The content was generally guided by biblical principles. She was a well-known conference speaker within Nigeria and in some instances internationally.

Death
Bimbo Odukoya boarded Sosoliso Airlines Flight 1145, bound for Port Harcourt from Abuja. On 10 December 2005 the airliner crashed during landing at Port Harcourt International Airport; Bimbo survived the initial impact and died from injuries on 11 December 2005.
Her mission church program continues in the management of her son Othniel Jimmy Odukoya.

Books written

 How to Choose a Life Partner, by Bimbo Odukoya,  Xulon Press (15 October 2005)
 Living Free, How to Handle Rejection by Bimbo Odukoya, Grace Springs Publishers, Inc., 2006
 Living Free, Overcoming Masturbation by Bimbo Odukoya, Grace Springs Publishers, Inc., 2006
 Marriage, Real People, Real Issues, Wise Counsel by Bimbo Odokoya, Grace Springs Publishers, Inc., 2006

References

External links

 Even in death, Bimbo Odukoya speaks
 A Profile of Pastor Bimbo
 The Fountain of Life Church Website
 Pastor Bimbo Odukoya Foundation Website
 Pastor Bimbo's books 

1960 births
2005 deaths
Yoruba Christian clergy
Nigerian television evangelists
Nigerian Christians
University of Ibadan alumni
Victims of aviation accidents or incidents in Nigeria
Women Christian clergy